Dizajabad (also Romanized as Dīzajābād; also known as Dizag, Dīzaj Kharābeh, and Dīzeh Kharābeh) is a village in Bonab Rural District of the Central District of Zanjan County, Zanjan province, Iran. At the 2006 National Census, its population was 3,688 in 927 households. The following census in 2011 counted 4,326 people in 1,286 households. The latest census in 2016 showed a population of 4,157 people in 1,294 households; it was the largest village in its rural district.

References 

Zanjan County

Populated places in Zanjan Province

Populated places in Zanjan County